Goreway Power Station is a natural gas power station owned by  Capital Power Corporation, in Brampton, Ontario.  The plant is used primarily during periods of peak demand.  Gas is supplied by underground pipelines from the nearby Enbridge facility.

Description
At 875 MW the plant is the second largest gas fired station in Canada behind the Greenfield Energy Centre and consists of:
 3+1 CCGT with 7001FB gas turbines

References

External links

 Goreway Station Partnership
 Goreway Station

Buildings and structures in Brampton
Natural gas-fired power stations in Ontario
Toyota Tsusho